The Frontier Service, officially called the Committee for State Border Protection of the National Security Service and commonly referred to as the National Border Guard, is a department of the military and National Security Service of Uzbekistan responsible for border security, part of the Security Service since 2005.

Structure

Navy 
A small riverine naval force is operated by the Frontier Service on the Amu Darya river, with two Gurza-class gunboats in service as well as other small craft.

Civil Guard 
In early 2021, the government ordered the creation of civilian border guard detachments to assist the border troops. It recruits citizens between the ages of 18 and 60 who live in village near the national border, and can work on a voluntary basis. The detachments aide in border surveillance and conducts night patrols.

Operation

Border clashes 
It has had many disagreements with the Frontier Forces of Kyrgyzstan since 2011.

Covid-19 
The Border Troops helped respond to the spread of the COVID-19 pandemic in Uzbekistan. It received personal protective equipment by the EU-funded BOMCA Programme, which included 15 000 facemasks.

References

Military of Uzbekistan
Government of Uzbekistan
Law enforcement in Uzbekistan
Guard